The Dark Tower: The Drawing of the Three - Bitter Medicine is a five-issue comic book limited series published by Marvel Comics. It is the fourteenth comic book miniseries based on Stephen King's The Dark Tower series of novels. It is plotted by Robin Furth, scripted by Peter David, and illustrated by Jonathan Marks and Lee Loughridge, with covers by Nimit Malavia. Stephen King is the Creative and Executive Director of the project. The first issue was published on April 20, 2016.

Publication dates
Issue #1: April 20, 2016
Issue #2: May 11, 2016
Issue #3: June 8, 2016
Issue #4: July 13, 2016
Issue #5: August 31, 2016

Collected editions
The entire five-issue run of Bitter Medicine was collected into a paperback edition, released by Marvel on October 18, 2016.

See also
The Dark Tower (comics)

References

External links

Dark Tower Official Site

2016 comics debuts
Drawing of the Three - Bitter Medicine, The